Angelo Michele Iorio (born 17 January 1948) is an Italian politician, former President of Molise from 1998 to 1999 and from 2001 to 2013.

Biography 
After graduating in Medicine at the Sapienza University of Rome, Iorio began his medical career as a surgeon at the Ospedale Civile in Isernia.

In 1975 he joined the Christian Democracy and between 1980 and 1990 he held various positions in local administrations: councilor for public works in the province of Isernia, councilor for urban planning and Mayor of Isernia.

In 1994, after the dissolution of the DC, he joined the Italian People's Party, in whose lists he was elected for the 1995 regional elections. In February 1998 Iorio leaves the PPI to join Forza Italia. Subsequently, he promoted a majority that was different from the one that came out from the 1995 regional elections: he then replaced the president Marcello Veneziale from The Olive Tree coalition and took over his place as President of Molise.

After having been defeated at the 2000 regional elections, due to some defects of form Iorio manages to cancel the result of the elections and one year later he manages to be re-elected President of Molise. He is later re-confirmed governor at the 2006 and the 2011 regional elections, tough these last elections are cancelled due to irregularity in the voting.

Iorio tries once again to be elected governor at the 2013 regional elections, but is badly defeated by the Democratic Party candidate Paolo Di Laura Frattura.

After failing to be elected to the Senate at the 2018 general election, Iorio candidates at the regional council of Molise at the 2018 regional elections, supporting the centre-right governor candidate Donato Toma, who is elected President of Molise. Iorio currently holds a seat in the regional council of Molise, elected with Us with Italy.

References

External links 
Files about his parliamentary activities (in Italian): XIV, XV legislature.

1948 births
Living people
Christian Democracy (Italy) politicians
Italian People's Party (1994) politicians
Forza Italia politicians
The People of Freedom politicians
20th-century Italian politicians
21st-century Italian politicians
People from the Province of Campobasso
Italian surgeons
Mayors of Isernia
Sapienza University of Rome alumni